Hunzib is a Northeast Caucasian language spoken by the Hunzib people in southern Dagestan, near the Russian border with Georgia.

Classification
Hunzib belongs to the Tsezic group of the Northeast Caucasian languages. It is most closely related to Bezhta and Khwarshi, according to the latest research. Other Tsezic languages include Tsez and Hinukh. Khwarshi was previously grouped together with Tsez and Hinukh instead of with Hunzib.

Geographic distribution
Hunzib is not an official language, nor is it written. It is spoken in the Tsunta and Kizilyurt districts of Dagestan and in two villages across the Russian border in Georgia.

Phonology

Vowels
Vowels in Hunzib may be short, long, or nasalized.

Consonants
Hunzib has 35 consonants.

Grammar

Gender
Like a number of other Northeast Caucasian languages, Hunzib has a grammatical gender system with five classes. The first classes, I and II mark male and female rationals, respectively, while the remaining classes mark non-humans. Gender marking is covert on nouns, but appears in agreement on verbs, adjectives, pronouns, and adverbial constructions.

 When preceding a nasalized vowel, class markers b- and r- surface as m- and n- respectively.

Nouns
Nouns in Hunzib come in five noun classes: male, female, and three classes for inanimate objects. There are a number of cases in Hunzib, including the absolutive, ergative, genitive, instrumental. A number of other case-like markers indicate direction and include dative, adessive, superessive, contactive, comitative and allative declensions. The following are taken from Helma van den Berg's A Grammar of Hunzib.

Case
Hunzib has four basic grammatical cases, the absolutive, ergative, genitive, and instrumental. The absolutive case is formed from the base stem, and the other cases are formed from the oblique stem.

 After vowels
 After consonants

Hunzib also has a series of local cases, where localizations are combined with directional suffixes. The dative and adessive cases have syntactic functions as well, but are morphologically local.

 The vowel in these forms will be a duplicate of the vowel in the syllable to which it attaches.

Oblique stem
Cases other than the absolutive are formed by attaching the relevant case marker to an oblique stem, which is often the base stem plus some lexically determined extension.

Some nouns (around 7%) do not use any extension and the oblique and base stems are identical. These words generally end in a vowel, like "father" ABS [ɑbu], GEN [ɑbu-s]. A small number of Hunzib nouns exhibit stem alternation, like "moon" ABS [boo], GEN [bɨə].

Verbs
Most verbs agree in class and number with the noun in the phrase that is in the absolutive case. As Hunzib has ergative alignment, that equals the subject of intransitive sentences and the direct object of transitive sentences.

Word order
Hunzib usually follows a subject–object–verb word order.

References

External links
Hunzib basic lexicon at the Global Lexicostatistical Database

Agglutinative languages
Northeast Caucasian languages
Languages of Russia
Dagestan
Endangered Caucasian languages